Stretch and Bobbito: Radio That Changed Lives is a 2015 documentary film about the Stretch Armstrong and Bobbito Show, starring Adrian "Stretch Armstrong" Bartos and Bobbito Garcia. The influential show helped to launch the careers of numerous hip hop artists, particularly those  along the East Coast.

Background
DJ Stretch Armstrong (Adrian Bartos) and Bobbito Garcia hosted the radio show from the WKCR station at Columbia University.

References

External links
 Official

2015 films
American documentary films
East Coast hip hop
2010s English-language films
WKCR-FM
2010s American films